Peace and Sport, also known as "L’Organisation pour la Paix par le Sport" is a neutral and independent organization based in the Principality of Monaco and under the patronage of Prince Albert II of Monaco.

Peace and Sport work in areas across the world where communities have become estranged from one another and where traditional policies have failed to establish dialogue, intending to restore peaceful relations. Its objective is to bring the structuring values of sport to the heart of communities and individuals in crisis throughout the world.

The organization puts sport and its values at the heart of local development projects conducted within communities in crisis around the world. Exercising its missions in post-conflict zones, areas of extreme poverty or lacking social cohesion, Peace and Sport's goal is to make sport a vehicle for tolerance, respect, sharing and citizenship.

After retiring from professional football in late 2018, Ivorian footballing legend Didier Drogba, became Vice President of the organization.

The current winner of Peace and Sport's Champions for Peace Award is Argentine footballer Lionel Messi.

Field actions 
Since its creation, Peace and Sport has developed 12 field programs in 13 countries. The organisation works with local project leaders (governments, NGOs, National Olympic Committees and sports federations) in areas affected by extreme poverty, the consequences of conflicts and an absence of social cohesion. This partnership enables the development of programs that use sport and its educational and structural values to tackle various social issues within communities.

In 2018, Peace and Sport 4 field actions are located in 3 major regions : the African Great Lakes region, Za'atari Refugee Camp in Jordan and France. Those 4 field actions are:

 The Friendship Games is an annual multisport event with peacebuilding activities that gathers youngsters from Rwanda, Democratic Republic of Congo and Burundi.
 The "Live Together" program takes place in Za’atari refugee camp in Jordan. It aims at creating social cohesion through sport among refugees of different ages and gender.
 The "Sports Workshops" uses sport as a social link creator to make it a vector for integration and professional integration on the French territory.
The "African Great Lakes" program supports with the involvement of National Olympic Committees, international sport federations, local authorities and Champions for Peace, 6 training centers through sport and peacebuilding activities.

The "Act For What Matters" programs 
In 2016, Peace and Sport launched a global program called "Act for What Matters". It is a call for project to partner with 8 NGOs active on every continent in the field of peace building through Sport. Its goal is to develop bonds between International Federations, NGOs, NOCs and local authorities, building capacity of the educators on the ground, helping them to maintain and develop sustainable Sport for Peace programs.

"Sport Simple" solutions 
Peace and Sport created a "Sport simple" manual. Sport Simple activities are sporting activity whose practice area, equipment and rules are adapted
to the environment in which it is carried out. This makes the sport easier to play and facilitates its use as a tool to promote and strengthen sustainable peace.

For example, World Rugby recognizes and promotes "touch rugby", an adapted version of "traditional" rugby. Touch rugby is based on adapted rules and principles that allow participants to play rugby without having to partake in contact.

The Champions for Peace 

The Champions for Peace are high-level international athletes who want to support the most disadvantaged communities through sport. These athletes are gathered in the club of Champions for Peace. It allows the champions to have a structure of action and common expression in favor of sports projects in the service of peace and social and human development.

These athletes use their notoriety, skills and their means in the service of projects for the development of peace through sport. The latest athlete to become a Champion for Peace was Argentine football player Lionel Messi in December 2020.

List of Champions for Peace :

Lionel Messi
Didier Drogba
Yohan Blake
Novak Djokovic
Christian Karembeu
Philippe Gilbert
Paula Radcliffe
Ronald Agénor
Jean-Baptiste Alaize
Isaac Angbo
Serge Betsen
Surya Bonaly
Hugo Bonneval 
Rohan Bopanna
Benjamin Boukpeti 
Vittorio Brumotti
Sergei Bubka
Loris Capirossi
Sébastien Chabal
Guo Chuan
Charmaine Crooks 
Randy De Puniet
Donna De Varona
Stéphane Diagana
Momo Dridi
Hicham El Guerrouj 
Daniel Elena
Rania Elwani
Fedor Emelianenko 
Maro Engel
Tony Estanguet 
Elías Figueroa
Laura Flessel
Jean-Philippe Fleurian 
Dick Fosbury
Laure Fournier 
Fredericks Frankie
Pierre Frolla
Christopher Froome 
Diana Gandega
Pascal Gentil
Habiba Ghribi
Hugo Giraldo Lopez 
Tatiana Golovin
Bertrand Grospellier 
Imanol Harinordoquy
Marlène Harnois
Muriel Hurtis
Yelena Isinbaeva 
Olivier Jacque
Peter Karlsson
Robert Karlsson
Keita Daba Modibo
Wilson Kipketer
Johann Koss
Alexandra Kosteniuk 
Willy Kouyaté
Fareed Lafta
Sabri Lamouchi 
Tahl Leibovitz
Sébastien Loeb 
Jonah Lomu
Tegla Loroupe 
Dan Luger
Adrien Mare
Florence Masnada 
Felipe Massa
Bradley McGee 
Aya Medany
Kaveh Mehrabi 
Nouria Mérah-Benida 
Steve Mesler
Elana Meyer
Jérôme Meyer 
Zsolt Moradi
Vénuste Niyongabo 
Stuart O'Grady
Sarah Ourahmoune 
Marie-José Pérec
Florent Piétrus
Sylvia Poll
Aisam-ul-Haq Qureshi 
Marc Raquil
Édgar Rentería 
Ángel Rodríguez 
Kashif Siddiqi
Sidiki Sidibé
Marco Simone
Sébastien Squillaci
Bruno Sroka
Helena Suková 
Julio Teherán 
Honey Thaljieh 
Maria Toorpakai
Jean-François Tordo
Gabriela Traña
Gregory Vallarino 
Alexandre Vinokourov 
Patrick Viriamu
Blanka Vlašić
Chris Waddell
Pernilla Wiberg
Isabelle Yacoubou
Pedro Alejandro Yang
Samir Aït Saïd
Mutaz Barshim
Marie Bochet
Balla Dièye
Ladji Doucouré
Laurence Fischer
Stefany Hernández
Samantha Murray
Fodé Ndao
Mélissa Plaza
Ryu Seung-min

Peace and Sport Forum

The Forum 

The Peace and Sport International Forum is an annual event taking place in Monaco.
It brings together people key-decision makers including Heads of State and Ministers, sport governing bodies, high-level athletes, international organizations, NGOs and Academia, and Champions for Peace. 
It aims at identifying new solutions to fix international issues through sport.
Muhammad Yunus, Didier Drogba or Christian Karembeu were among the well-known speakers during this event.

Since 2017, Peace and Sport has organized a biennial regional forum to highlight local peace-through-sport initiatives. The first edition took place in Rhodes, Greece on October 18, 2018 co-organized with the South Aegean region.

The Awards 
Launched in 2008, the Peace and Sport Awards put the spotlight on initiatives and individuals who have particularly contributed to peace and social stability in the world.

The Awards reward the expertise of various stakeholders working for sustainable peace through sport, through initiatives promoting the best practices in the field.

Among the previous laureates, we find Blaise Matuidi, Pau Gasol, International Association of Athletics Federations (IAAF), FIFA or International Judo Federation.

International Day of Sport for Development and Peace

April 6 web platform 

At the UN headquarters in New York, on 23 August 2013, the UN General Assembly declared April 6 as the International Day of Sport for Development and Peace (IDSDP) – a decision that represented a historic step for the organization and its goals.

This day is commemorated globally each year by international, regional, national sport and development organizations to honor the role that sport plays in society, whether by encouraging healthier lifestyles, making sport more widely accessible, or using it as a vehicle for development in areas made vulnerable by conflict, poverty and inequality.

Peace and Sport has developed a web platform for expression and promotion aimed at highlighting the initiatives led to celebrate 6 April.

In 3 editions, Peace and Sport and its platform has promoted 840 projects in over 170 countries.

#WhiteCard 

The #WhiteCard campaign highlights the actors of the peace-through-sport movement, and to provide an opportunity for all those who believe in the power of sport to change the world, to rally their support around a symbolic gesture.

Everyone can get involved easily: participants just have to take a 'selfie' or a group photo holding up a white card, just like a referee on a playing field. They then post the #WhiteCard photo on Facebook, Twitter or Instagram.

Significant Actions

Rapprochement between North Korea and South Korea 

In 2017, Peace and Sport in cooperation with the International Ice Hockey Federation (IIHF) and the 2018 PyeongChang Organizing Committee unified players from the two countries for a photo during  the 2017 IIHF Ice Hockey Women's World Championship Division II Group A in Gangneung. Athletes posed on the ice, holding up a #WhiteCard, the symbol of the sport-for-development-and-peace movement.

In 2018, a new step forward is achieved: Peace and Sport and the IIHF united the joint North–South Korea women's hockey team for a symbolic photo during the PyeongChang 2018 Olympic Winter Games.

UNFP / Peace and Sport Trophy 
In 2015, the first UNFP / Peace and Sport trophy (French National Union of Professional Soccer) was awarded to the campaign "Soyons fiers de nos différences" (Be proud of our differences) led in Ligue 1 and Ligue 2 on the initiative of the Ligue de football professionnel and the Panamboyz United.

Peace and Sport Documentary Prize at Sportel Awards Ceremony 
During the Sportel Awards Ceremony, Peace and Sport rewarded a filmmaker who, through a video clip or a movie, emphasizes the positive role of sport in peace promotion with the Peace and Sport Documentary Prize.

In 2018, the prize was awarded to Jamillah Van der Hulst for her movie "Fighting for Life".

Monte-Carlo Fighting Trophy 
In 2016, the Monaco organisation partnered with the Monte-Carlo Fighting Trophy to raise funds for Peace and Sport field actions.
In 2018, the experience is renewed for the 5th Edition of the Trophy.

"I Move For Peace" fundraising 
I Move for Peace is a program that enables every active and would-be sportsperson (amateurs, professionals, teams, companies etc.) to put their sporting challenge at the service of fundraising for Peace and Sport's field programs.

References

External links

 
 Champions for Peace
 Peace and Sport Awards

Sports organisations of Monaco
Politics and sports